The Crescent-marked lily aphid or Mottled arum aphid, (Neomyzus circumflexus), also known as Aulacorthum circumflexum, is an aphid in the superfamily Aphidoidea in the order Hemiptera. It is a true bug and sucks sap from plants. It is also known to transmit plant viruses as well.

Host
Normally host in Adiantum, Calla, Cineraria, Cyclamen, Fuchsia, Zantedeschia, Viola tricolor, and Physalis peruviana.

Economic importance
It is known to be a major insect pest on species of Asparagus, Begonia, and Fuchsia.

References 

 http://aphid.speciesfile.org/Common/basic/Taxa.aspx?TaxonNameID=1386

Macrosiphini
Agricultural pest insects
Hemiptera of North America
Insect pests of millets